Madenköy (literally village of mines)  is a  village in Ulukışla district of Niğde Province, Turkey. There is a small lake at the west of the village and the frog species  Rana holtzi inhabits the shore of the lake. A mining company plans to open gold mines around the village . But villagers oppose the plan. The population of Madenköy is 171   as of 2011.

See also
Karagöl

References

Villages in Ulukışla District